Albania has the following national youth football teams:

 Albania national under-23 football team
 Albania national under-21 football team
 Albania national under-20 football team
 Albania national under-19 football team
 Albania national under-18 football team
 Albania national under-17 football team
 Albania national under-16 football team
 Albania national under-15 football team

The Albania national youth football team are the national under-23, under-21, under-20, under-19, under-18, under-17 and under-16 football teams of Albania and are controlled by the Albanian Football Association. The youth teams of Albania participate in tournaments sanctioned by both FIFA and UEFA and also participates in world, regional, and local international tournaments. Youth international campaigns normally begin in August and end in the following July.

The Albania national under-23 football team represents Albania in international football at this age level and is controlled by Albanian Football Association, the governing body for football in Albania. The team competed in the UEFA European Under-23 Championship & Balkan Youth Championship, but after the rule change in 1975s, the event had an age limit of 21.

The Albania national under-21 football team competes in the UEFA European Under-21 Championship, which is held every two years.

The Albania national under-20 football team is often cited as a feeder squad to the under-21 squad. Most of the player picked for this team became U-21 internationals.
Because there is no under-20 competition at UEFA level, Albania's under-20 side generally only competes when it qualified for the FIFA U-20 World Cup, which is held every 2 years. Qualification for this competition is achieved in view of performance at the preceding summer's UEFA European Under-19 Football Championship.
Albania have never played a game with the U-20 squad and the team was only formed after an invitation to play in 2009 Mediterranean Games in Pescara, Italy. Then they participated also in the 2013 Mediterranean Games in Mersin, Turkey.

The Albania national under-19 football team competes at this age level in the UEFA European Under-19 Football Championship, as well as any other under-19 international football tournaments.
Before 2002, the event was classified as a U-18 tournament and at this level Albania competed with the Albania national under-18 football team, which it only plays in the friendly matches, recently against Italy on 19 May 2011, when they last played a match.

The Albania national under-17 football team competes in the FIFA U-17 World Cup and the UEFA European Under-17 Football Championship, as well as any other under-17 international football tournaments. Before 2002, the event was classified as a U-16 tournament and at this level Albania competed with the Albania national under-16 football team, which it only plays in the friendly matches.

The Albania national under-15 football team founded in 2009 competes in Youth Olympic Games.

Albania national under-21 squad

Current squad
COACH:  Alban Bushi

The following players were called up for the 2019 UEFA European Under-21 Championship qualification match against Northern Ireland U21 on 10 November 2017.

Caps and goals as of 10 November 2017

Recent call-ups
Following players have been called up in the previous 12 months and are still eligible to represent Under 21 team.

 INJ = Withdrew due to the injury.

 MOV = Withdrew to play for Kosovo.

Coaching staff
Current coaching staff:

Albania national under-20 squad

COACH:  Alban Bushi

The following players were called up for the double friendly match against Azerbaijan on 21 & 26 January 2018.

Caps and goals as of 14 November 2017

Recent call-ups
The following players have been called up for Albania U20 squad within the past 12 months.

Notes
INJ Withdrew due to injury
PRE Preliminary squad / standby
RET Retired from international football
SUS Suspended from national team

Coaching staff
Current coaching staff:

Albania national under-19 squad

Current squad
COACH:  Erjon Bogdani

The following players were called up to participate in the 2018 UEFA European Under-19 Championship qualification from 4–10 October 2017.

Caps and goals as of 10 October 2017

Recent call-ups
Following are listed players called up in the previous 12 months that are still eligible to represent Under 19 team.

|-----
! colspan="9" bgcolor="B0D3FB" align="left" |
|----- bgcolor="#DFEDFD"

|-----
! colspan="9" bgcolor="B0D3FB" align="left" |
|----- bgcolor="#DFEDFD"

|-----
! colspan="9" bgcolor="B0D3FB" align="left" |
|----- bgcolor="#DFEDFD"

 PRE = Preliminary squad.

Coaching staff
Current coaching staff:

Albania national under-18 squad
The following players were named in the last squad for the friendly match against Italy on 19 May 2011 (When they last played a match).

Players in italics have played internationally at a higher level.

Albania national under-17 squad

Current squad
COACH:  Džemal Mustedanagić

The following players were called up to participate in the 2018 UEFA European Under-17 Championship qualification from 19–25 October 2017.

Caps and goals as of 25 October 2017.

Recent call-ups
Following are listed players called up in the previous 12 months.

|-----
! colspan="9" bgcolor="B0D3FB" align="left" |
|----- bgcolor="#DFEDFD"

|-----
! colspan="9" bgcolor="B0D3FB" align="left" |
|----- bgcolor="#DFEDFD"

|-----
! colspan="9" bgcolor="B0D3FB" align="left" |
|----- bgcolor="#DFEDFD"

 PRE = Preliminary squad.
 INJ = Withdrew due to injury.

Coaching staff 
Current coaching staff:

Albania national under-16 squad

Current squad
COACH:  Džemal Mustedanagić

The following players participated in the 2017 Mercedez Benz Aegean Cup International Youth Tournament in Turkey.

Caps and goals as of 23 November 2017.

Coaching staff 
Current coaching staff:

Albania national under-15 squad
COACH:  Eqerem Memushi

The following players were called up for the double friendly matches against Montenegro U15 on 28 & 30 September 2017.

Recent call-ups
The following players have been called up within the last 12 months.

Coaching staff
Current coaching staff:

See also
 Albania national football team
 Albania national under-23 football team
 Albania national under-21 football team
 Albania national under-20 football team
 Albania national under-19 football team
 Albania national under-18 football team
 Albania national under-17 football team
 Albania national under-16 football team
 Albania national under-15 football team
 Albania national football team results
 Albanian Superliga
 Football in Albania
 List of Albania international footballers

References

External links
 Albania U-21 profile at Soccerway
 Albania U-21 profile at FSHF.org
 Albania U-21 profile at UEFA.com
 FIFA U-20 World Cup website
 Official FA Albania site
 Albania U-19 at UEFA.com
 UEFA European U-19 C'ship – UEFA.com
Albania U-17 profile at Soccerway
Under-17 – Albania – UEFA.com

youth
Football in Albania
Youth sport in Albania
National youth association football teams